Caspiobdella is a genus of annelids belonging to the family Piscicolidae.

The species of this genus are found in Europe.

Species:

Caspiobdella caspica 
Caspiobdella fadejewi 
Caspiobdella tuberculata 
Caspiobdella volgensis

References

Annelids